Maarjamõisa (Estonian for "Mary's Manor") is a neighbourhood of Tartu, Estonia. It's located about 2 km southwest of the city centre, just north of Riia street (Jõhvi–Tartu–Valga road, E264). With the population of 382 (as of 31 December 2013), Maarjamõisa is the smallest neighbourhood of Tartu.

Maarjamõisa is best known as a medical centre, because most of the buildings of Tartu University Clinic are located in Maarjamõisa, including all the Faculty of Medicine of the University of Tartu. Recently also other faculties of the university have opened their new buildings there, such as the Technology Institute, the Biomedical Center (Biomedicum), the Chemistry building (Chemicum), and the Physics building (Physicum).

References

Tartu